The 2005–06 Washington State Cougars men's basketball team represented Washington State University for the 2005–06 NCAA Division I men's basketball season. Led by second-year head coach Dick Bennett, the Cougars were members of the Pacific-10 Conference and played their home games on campus at Beasley Coliseum in Pullman, Washington.

Seeded tenth in the conference tournament, the Cougars met seventh seed Oregon in the opening round. The Ducks had swept the regular season series and won the tournament game by eleven points.

Bennett stepped down as head coach after the season and was succeeded by son Tony.

Postseason result

|-
!colspan=5 style=| Pacific-10 Tournament

References

External links
Sports Reference – Washington State Cougars: 2005–06 basketball season

Washington State Cougars men's basketball seasons
Washington State Cougars
Washington State
Washington State